New Salem, is a borough located in York County, Pennsylvania. As of the 2020 census, the borough had a total population of 818.

Geography 
New Salem is located at 39°54'9" North, 76°47'35" West (39.902526, -76.793162).

New Salem lies near North Codorus Township. It is a sleepy town with two streets, two pizza shops, a gas station, bar, and post office.

Demographics 

As of the census of 2000, there were 648 people, 258 households, and 198 families residing in the borough.  The population density was 1,427.6 people per square mile (556.0/km2).  There were 266 housing units at an average density of 586.0 per square mile (228.2/km2).  The racial makeup of the borough was 97.69% White, 0.31% African American, 0.00% Native American, 1.85% Asian, 0.00% Pacific Islander, 0.15% from other races, and 0.00% from two or more races.  0.31% of the population were Hispanic or Latino of any race.

There were 258 households, out of which 29.8% had children under the age of 18 living with them, 66.3% were married couples living together, 8.5% had a female householder with no husband present, and 22.9% were non-families. 19.0% of all households were made up of individuals, and 9.7% had someone living alone who was 65 years of age or older.  The average household size was 2.51 and the average family size was 2.79.

In the borough the population was spread out, with 22.8% under the age of 18, 5.4% from 18 to 24, 29.2% from 25 to 44, 25.8% from 45 to 64, and 16.8% who were 65 years of age or older.  The median age was 41 years.  For every 100 females there were 97.6 males.  For every 100 females age 18 and over, there were 96.9 males.

The median income for a household in the borough was $51,944, and the median income for a family was $53,295. Males had a median income of $39,028 versus $22,321 for females. The per capita income for the borough was $18,802.  3.9% of the population and 3.7% of families were below the poverty line.  Out of the total population, 3.3% of those under the age of 18 and 6.5% of those 65 and older were living below the poverty line.

History 
New Salem, or York New Salem, added the prefix York because of a dispute between another borough with the same name in Pennsylvania. No two boroughs can have the same name for postal reasons, according to the federal government. New Salem was founded by settlers from Salem, Massachusetts and from settlers from nearby York.

References

Populated places established in 1876
Boroughs in York County, Pennsylvania
1876 establishments in Pennsylvania